James Britten Hannah Crossan (19 December 1902 – 19 April 1979) was an Australian rules footballer who played with South Melbourne in the Victorian Football League (VFL).

He later served in the Royal Australian Air Force in Papua New Guinea during World War II.

Notes

External links 

1902 births
1979 deaths
Australian rules footballers from Victoria (Australia)
Sydney Swans players
Prahran Football Club players